Trevor Robert Bryce (born 1940) is an Australian Hittitologist specializing in ancient and classical Near-eastern history. He is semi-retired and lives in Brisbane.

His book, The Kingdom of the Hittites, is popular among English-speaking readers since the study of the Hittites has been dominated by German-language scholarship. A new improved and updated edition of this popular book, featuring 90 additional pages, was published in 2005. Bryce is a professor in the School of History, Philosophy, Religion, and Classics at The University of Queensland.

Family 
He has two children and five grandchildren.

Awards and professional elections
 1989 Fellow, Australian Academy of the Humanities
 2001 Centenary Medal
 2010 Doctor of Letters, University of Queensland

Selected publications

 — Planned as a two-volume project, only Volume 1 has been published:

See also
Horizon - Bryce's work was also highlighted in the March 2004 episode "The Truth of Troy".

Notes

References

External links

 

1940 births
Living people
Historians of antiquity
Hittitologists
Fellows of the Australian Academy of the Humanities
Recipients of the Centenary Medal
Lycia
Australian historians